Season one of Mira quién baila premiered on Univision on September 12, 2010 and ended on November 21, 2010. The TV series is the Spanish version of British version Strictly Come Dancing and American Version Dancing with the Stars (U.S. TV series). Ten celebrities are paired with ten professional ballroom dancers. Javier Posa and Chiquinquirá Delgado are the hosts for this season.

Judges

The Celebrities

Professionals

Scores 

Red numbers indicate the lowest score for each week.
Green numbers indicate the highest score for each week.
 indicates the couple eliminated that week.
 indicates the couple withdrew from the competition.
 indicates the couple that was safe but withdrew from the competition.
 indicates the winning couple.
 indicates the runner-up couple.
 indicates the third-place couple.

Call-Out Order

Week 1–3 were duel weeks, with no actual eliminations.
Week 8 is a non elimination week, due to a double eviction the previous week.
Week 8 worst dances were Jackie and Scarlet.
Week 9 Rogelio and Vadhir were given the advance ticket to go to the Finale.
Week 10 Even though Diana had better scores she was eliminated.

Averages 
This table only counts dances scored on the traditional 30-point scale.

 RBN/D: Rank by Number of Dances/Nominations
 NOD: Number of Dances
 NOM: Number of Nominations

Dances performed 

 Performed in finale but not scored
 First Place Dance-Off
 Elimination Dance-Off
 Safe from the Elimination Dance-Off

Notes 

Due to a back injury sustained in the rehearsal for the October 10 show, Guerrido was medically disqualified from dancing in the live show the same evening; the Foxtrot, while rehearsed, was never performed competitively.

Guerrido couldn't perform on the October 10 show, that's why she was nominated automatically.

Dance schedule 
The celebrities and professional partners danced one of these routines for each corresponding week.

Various contestants dance the same dance routine.
Regional Mexicano was the only dance that was performed each week throughout the competition
Vallenato was the only dance, that was performed only once throughout the competition

References

External links
 Official website of Mira Quien Baila
 

2010 American television seasons